John Ralph Ormsby-Gore, 1st Baron Harlech (3 June 1816 – 15 June 1876), was a British peer and Conservative Member of Parliament.

Biography
Lord Harlech was the eldest son of William Ormsby-Gore, an Anglo-Irish aristocrat, and Mary Jane Ormsby. He was elected to the House of Commons for Carnarvonshire in 1837, a seat he held until 1841, and later represented North Shropshire from 1859 to 1876.

On 14 January 1876, he was raised to the peerage as Baron Harlech, of Harlech in the County of Merioneth, with remainder to his brother William in the absence of male heirs.

Marriage and children
Lord Harlech married Sarah, daughter of Sir John Tyrell, 2nd Baronet, on 4 June 1844. They had one child:

 Hon. Fanny Mary Katherine Ormsby-Gore (born 1845, died 25 November 1927)

Lord Harlech died on 15 June 1876, aged 60, having held the title for only five months. As he had no son, he was succeeded according to the special remainder by his brother William.

Lady Harlech died in 1898.

Coat of arms

References

Kidd, Charles, Williamson, David (editors). Debrett's Peerage and Baronetage (1990 edition). New York: St Martin's Press, 1990,

External links 
 

1816 births
1876 deaths
Conservative Party (UK) MPs for English constituencies
UK MPs 1837–1841
UK MPs 1859–1865
UK MPs 1865–1868
UK MPs 1868–1874
UK MPs 1874–1880
UK MPs who were granted peerages
Conservative Party (UK) MPs for Welsh constituencies
John
Peers of the United Kingdom created by Queen Victoria
1
Welsh landowners